Diamond Peak is both the highest and most topographically prominent mountain in both the Diamond Mountains and Eureka County, in Nevada, United States. It ranks thirty-ninth among the most topographically prominent peaks in the state.  The peak is located on the border of Eureka County and White Pine County, about 12 miles northeast of the small town of Eureka, between the south end of Diamond Valley and the central portion of Newark Valley. It is on public land administered by the Bureau of Land Management and thus has no access restrictions.

Summit panorama

References

Landforms of Eureka County, Nevada
Mountains of Nevada